Leanne Smith (born May 28, 1987) is a World Cup alpine ski racer from the United States, and specializes in the speed events.

Early life
Born in North Conway, New Hampshire, Smith attended A. Crosby Kennett High School. She spent her skiing time on the local mountain, Cranmore, where the founder of the first skiing school in the United States, Hannes Schneider, arrived from Austria. Following Cranmore, she trained with the Mount Washington Valley Ski Team, coached by Kurt Simard. Smith graduated from high school in 2005, and then attended the University of New Hampshire in Durham and raced for the Wildcats in 2006.

U.S. Ski Team
After her freshman year at UNH, Smith joined the U.S. Ski Team for the 2007 season, on the developmental team. She moved up to the World Cup team the following season and made her debut in December 2007 in Canada at Lake Louise and finished 23rd in the downhill.

Smith's best World Cup finish is 2nd in a downhill at Val-d'Isère in December 2012. She represented the U.S. at the Winter Olympics in 2010 and 2014, and at the World Championships in 2011 and 2013.

World Cup results

Season standings

Top ten finishes
2 podiums – (2 DH)

World Championship results

Olympic results

References

External links

 
 Leanne Smith World Cup standings at the International Ski Federation
 
 Leanne Smith at U.S. Ski Team
 Leanne Smith at Rossignol Skis
 
 
 

1987 births
Alpine skiers at the 2010 Winter Olympics
American female alpine skiers
Living people
Olympic alpine skiers of the United States
Alpine skiers at the 2014 Winter Olympics
21st-century American women